Erwin Fassbind (born 20 July 1957) is a Swiss bobsledder who competed in the late 1980s. He won two gold medals in the four-man event at the FIBT World Championships, earning them in 1986 and 1987. He also competed in the four man event at the 1988 Winter Olympics.

References

External links
Bobsleigh four-man world championship medalists since 1930

1957 births
Living people
Swiss male bobsledders
Olympic bobsledders of Switzerland
Bobsledders at the 1988 Winter Olympics
20th-century Swiss people